Otto Wilhelm Fischer (1 April 1915 – 29 January 2004) was an Austrian film and theatre actor, a leading man of West German cinema during the Wirtschaftswunder era of the 1950s and 1960s.

Biography
He was born in Klosterneuburg near Vienna, where he obtained his Matura degree at the local gymnasium secondary school. Fischer began studying English and German philology and art history at the University of Vienna, in 1936, however, he enlisted at the Max Reinhardt Seminar drama school. He had first engagements as an actor at the Vienna Theater in der Josefstadt, the Munich Kammerspiele, and the Vienna Volkstheater. In 1945 he reached the highpoint of his theatre career when he joined the ensemble of the Burgtheater.

Fischer began filming in 1936, his performance in the 1942 propaganda movie Vienna 1910 earned him an entry on Goebbel's Gottbegnadeten list. He made his breakthrough after the war starring in A Heidelberg Romance and numerous other romance films, often with female co-stars Maria Schell and Ruth Leuwerik.

While Fischer enjoyed a great career, unlike countrymen Oskar Werner, Curd Jürgens, Maria Schell and Romy Schneider, he never made it internationally. Worse, his American break ended before it began: he was signed to star with June Allyson in a remake of My Man Godfrey in 1956, but was fired after 16 days of shooting  and replaced by David Niven when Fischer reportedly lost his memory during filming. Fischer directed and starred opposite Anouk Aimée in a 1956 film, Ich suche Dich, based on the play, Jupiter Laughs, by A. J. Cronin.  In 1955, he directed and starred in Hanussen, a movie detailing the life of clairvoyant Erik Jan Hanussen. While the film is considered highly romanticized, it assisted historians and biographers in uncovering previously unknown facts. He also starred in the title role of tragic King Ludwig II of Bavaria in the classic German film, Ludwig II: Glanz und Ende eines Königs by Helmut Käutner.

In the early 1970s, he retired to live in Vernate, Ticino and to concentrate on linguistics and philosophy, on which he lectured and published a number of books. He died in Lugano, Switzerland of kidney failure.

Selected filmography
 Court Theatre (1936)
 Anton the Last (1939)
 My Daughter Lives in Vienna (1940)
 Vienna 1910 (1943)
 The Immortal Face (1947)
 Don't Dream, Annette (1949)
 Archduke Johann's Great Love (1950)
 A Tale of Five Cities (1951)
 A Heidelberg Romance (1951)
 A Thousand Red Roses Bloom (1952)
 Until We Meet Again (1952)
 Desires (1952)
 Cuba Cabana (1952)
 Dreaming Lips (1953)
 As Long as You're Near Me (1953)
 A Heart Plays False (1953)
 Diary of a Married Woman (1953)
 Portrait of an Unknown Woman (1954)
 A Love Story (1954)
 Ludwig II (1955)
 Hanussen (1955)
 Napoleon (1955)
 Ich suche Dich (1956)
 My Father, the Actor (1956)
 Scandal in Bad Ischl (1957)
 King in Shadow (1957)
  (1957)
  (1958)
 Peter Voss, Thief of Millions (1958)
 Arms and the Man (1958)
 Whirlpool (1959)
 And That on Monday Morning (1959)
 Menschen im Hotel (1959)
 Rebel Flight to Cuba  (1959)
 Peter Voss, Hero of the Day (1959)
 Grounds for Divorce (1960)
 Das Riesenrad (1961)
  (1961)
  (1961)
 Axel Munthe, The Doctor of San Michele (1962)
 Breakfast in Bed (1963)
 The Secret of the Black Widow (1963)
 Uncle Tom's Cabin (1965)

Honours and awards
 1950, 1951: Danube females
 1953–1955: Bambi award
 1955: Filmband in Silver (best actor) for Ludwig II: Glanz und Ende eines Königs 1956 – San Sebastián International Film Festival: Silver shell (Director, actor) for Ich suche Dich 1956: Price of Spanish film journalists (screenplay) for Ich suche Dich 1958–1961: Bambi award
 1958–1963: Bravo Otto
 1959: Filmband in Gold (best actor) for Arms and the Man (film) 1960: Austrian Cross of Honour for Science and Art, 1st class
 1961: Europa Prize for Das Riesenrad 1961: Honorary Member of the Association of the Spanish film journalists
 1970: Appointed Professor
 1977: Filmband in Gold for long and outstanding achievements in German film
 1987, 1990: Bambi award
 1987: Cordon Bleu du Saint Esprit
 1995: Grand Silver Decoration for Services to the Republic of Austria
 1996: Grand Gold Decoration for Services to the Republic of Austria
 Grand Merit Cross of the Federal Republic of Germany

Publications
 [-?-]:  Auferstehung in Hollywood. Texte, Wien: Österreichische Staatsdruckerei, o.J. 
 1986: Engelsknabe war ich keiner. Erinnerung an eine Jugend, Munich: Langen Müller 
 1999:  Ferner Klang. Texte, Ulm: Hess 
 2000:  Meine Geheimnisse. Erinnerungen und Gedanken, Munich: Langen Müller 

References

 Further reading 
 Holba, Herbert:  O. W. Fischer, Phänomen einer schauspielerischen Persönlichkeit, Wien 1964
 Popa, Dorin: O. W. Fischer, Seine Filme – sein Leben, Heyne, München 1989. 
 F.F.G.: ...was mich ankommt, als Gesicht, Traum und Empfindung. Das denkwürdigste Interview von O. W. Fischer'', Strom, Zürich 1977.

External links
 

1915 births
2004 deaths
Deaths from kidney failure
Austrian male film actors
20th-century Austrian male actors
Austrian film directors
People from Klosterneuburg
Commanders Crosses of the Order of Merit of the Federal Republic of Germany
Recipients of the Austrian Cross of Honour for Science and Art, 1st class
Recipients of the Grand Decoration for Services to the Republic of Austria
Recipients of the Bambi (prize)
German Film Award winners